An t-Iasgair (Scottish Gaelic for the Fisherman) is a skerry in the Little Minch, to the north of the Trotternish peninsula of Skye. It lies 1.5 miles north north west of Ru Bornesketaig and is marked by a navigation light. It is the largest and highest in a group of three rocks, with smaller neighbours of Sgeir nan Ruideag and An Dubh Sgeir.

See also

 List of lighthouses in Scotland
 List of Northern Lighthouse Board lighthouses

References

External links
 Northern Lighthouse Board 
 Closeup of the light

Landforms of the Isle of Skye
Skerries of Scotland
Islands of Highland (council area)